Francesco Nerli, seniore (1594–1670) was a Roman Catholic cardinal.

Biography
On 6 Jun 1650, he was consecrated bishop by Giovanni Giacomo Panciroli, Cardinal-Priest of Santo Stefano al Monte Celio, with Giovanni Battista Rinuccini, Archbishop of Fermo, and Luca Torreggiani, Archbishop of Ravenna, serving as co-consecrators.

While bishop, he was the principal consecrator of Francesco Pannocchieschi d'Elci, Archbishop of Pisa (1663).

References

1594 births
1670 deaths
17th-century Italian cardinals
17th-century Italian Roman Catholic archbishops